Neven Đurasek (born 15 August 1998) is a Croatian professional footballer who plays as a midfielder for Ukrainian Premier League club Shakhtar Donetsk.

References

External link
Neven Đurasek — CFF record

1998 births
Living people
Sportspeople from Varaždin
Association football midfielders
Croatian footballers
Croatia youth international footballers
Croatia under-21 international footballers
GNK Dinamo Zagreb II players
GNK Dinamo Zagreb players
NK Lokomotiva Zagreb players
NK Varaždin (2012) players
SC Dnipro-1 players
NK Olimpija Ljubljana (2005) players
FC Shakhtar Donetsk players
First Football League (Croatia) players
Croatian Football League players
Ukrainian Premier League players
Slovenian PrvaLiga players
Croatian expatriate footballers
Croatian expatriate sportspeople in Ukraine
Expatriate footballers in Ukraine
Croatian expatriate sportspeople in Slovenia
Expatriate footballers in Slovenia